Below is a list of poets who wrote or write much of their poetry in Croatian.

A
 Borislav Arapović (born 1935)

B
 Lidija Bajuk (born 1965)
 Juraj Baraković (1548–1628)
 Milan Begović (1876–1948)
 Ivan Belostenec (1593/1594–1675)
 Mirko Bogović (1816–1893)
 Tituš Brezovački (1757–1805)
 Ivana Brlić-Mažuranić (1874–1938)
 Ivan Bunić Vučić (1591/1592–1658)

C
 Dobriša Cesarić (1902–1980)
 Ilija Crijević (1463–1520)

D
 Arsen Dedić (1938–2015)
 Mak Dizdar (1917–1971)
 Dragutin Domjanić (1875–1933)
 Džore Držić (1461–1501)
 Marin Držić (1508–1567)

G
 Drago Gervais (1904–1957)
 Stanka Gjurić (Born 1956)
 Vladimir Gotovac (1930–2000)
 Ivan Gundulić (1589–1638)

H
 August Harambašić (1861–1911)
 Petar Hektorović (1487–1572)

J
 Dragojla Jarnević (1812–1875)
 Ivan Franjo Jukić (1818–1857)

K
 Petar Kanavelić (1637–1719)
 Brne Karnarutić (1515–1573)
 Jure Kaštelan (1919–1990)
 Jerolim Kavanjin (1641–1714)
 Ivan Goran Kovačić (1913–1943)
 Ivo Kozarčanin (1911–1941)
 Miroslav Krleža (1893–1981)
 Rajmund Kupareo (1914–1996)

M
 Marko Marulić (1450–1524)
 Antun Gustav Matoš (1873–1914)
 Šiško Menčetić (1457–1527)
 Andrija Kačić Miošić (1704–1760)

N
 Vladimir Nazor (1876–1949)
 Vjenceslav Novak (1859–1905)

O
 Ilija Okrugić (1827–1897)

P
 Vesna Parun (1922–2010)

S
 Sonja Smolec (born 1953)
 Đuro Sudeta (1903–1927)

Š
 Mihalj Šilobod Bolšić (1724–1787)
 Antun Branko Šimić (1898–1925)
 Antun Šoljan (1932–1993)
 Dragutin Tadijanović (1905–2007)

U
 Tin Ujević (1891–1955)

V
 Viktor Vida (1913–1960)
 Vladimir Vidrić (1875–1909)

W
 Ljubo Wiesner (1885–1951)

Lists of poets by language

Poets
Poets